Zaltan or Zelten is a city in the district of Nuqat al Khams of northwestern Libya. The city, which has a population of around 17,700 (2009), is on the Mediterranean coast.

History
The town has been in existence since, at least, Roman times. Archaeological excavations have uncovered, not only parts of the old town, but also Roman olive presses.

Economy
The surrounding area is primarily dryland farming with barley, wheat, olives, dates, citrus fruits, figs, and grapes raised for export. There is a secondary trade in livestock, primarily sheep, goats and camels, brought in from outlying communities. Salt has been collected in pans since Roman times. Zaltan's closeness to the Tunisian border has made Zaltan a regional center for trade. Olive oil and palm oil are produced locally.

Culture
There is a small museum in Zaltan displaying some of the local archaeological finds, and there is an annual poetry festival.

Notes

See also 
 List of cities in Libya

External links
 "Zaltan Map – Satellite Images of Zaltan", Maplandia

Populated places in Nuqat al Khams District
Baladiyat of Libya

fr:Zenten